James fitz Maurice FitzGerald (died 1579), called "fitz Maurice", was a native Irish and Anglo Norman captain-general of Desmond while Gerald FitzGerald, 14th Earl of Desmond, was detained in England by Queen Elizabeth after the Battle of Affane in 1565. He led the first Desmond Rebellion in 1569 and was sometimes called the "Archtraitor" by the English. He surrendered in 1573, prostrating himself in Kilmallock church before John Perrot, president of Munster.

In 1575, when the earl returned to Ireland, fitz Maurice went into exile on the continent. In July 1579 he invaded Ireland with a small force, landing at Dingle and then sailing around the tip of the Dingle peninsula into Smerwick Bay and occupying Dún an Óir (Fort of Gold). He died in a skirmish on 18 August.

Birth and origins 
James fitz Maurice was born early in the 16th century, the second son of Maurice fitz John FitzGerald and his wife Julia O'Mulryan. His father, called Totane, was a younger brother of James FitzGerald, 13th Earl of Desmond. Totane had been granted the barony of Kerricurrihy in southern County Cork, but Gerald fell out with Totane and wars were fought between the families.

His mother was the second daughter of Dermot O'Mulryan, chief of Owny, from Sulloghade in County Tipperary.

Early life 
Some time in his youth, Fitz Maurice married Katherine, daughter of William Burke of Muskerry. 

James and Katherine had three children:
 Maurice, who died in 1588 
 Gerald, who died in 1588 
 Alice, married Niall, son of Aodh (or Hugh) mac Felim O'Neill of Clandeboye (d. c. 1600), and whose son Niall Óg O'Neill of Killyleagh, Antrim (d. 1628) married Sarah MacDonnell, daughter of Randal MacDonnell, 1st Earl of Antrim.

His father (i.e. Totane) killed James FitzGerald, the de jure 12th Earl of Desmond, called "Court Page", on 15 March 1540. This changed the status of Totane's elder brother from James FitzGerald, de facto 13th Earl of Desmond, to James FitzGerald, de jure 13th Earl of Desmond. The 13th Earl died in 1558 and was succeeded by his eldest son of his 2nd marriage, Gerald FitzGerald, 14th Earl of Desmond. The 13th Earl's first marriage had been annulled for consanguinity. Totane died in 1564.

Captain of Desmond 
In 1565 Gerald FitzGerald, 14th Earl of Desmond, was defeated by the Butlers in the private Battle of Affane. In 1567 the 14th Earl and his brother, John of Desmond, were detained and sent to the Tower of London. During their absence, fitz Maurice became captain general of County Desmond with the warrant of the Earl. This meant he had authority over the soldiers retained in the service of the Desmond FitzGeralds. This was arranged by Eleanor Butler, Countess of Desmond who had arrested fitz Maurice.

In July 1568, fitz Maurice entered Clanmaurice, the territory of Thomas Fitzmaurice, 16th Baron Kerry and lord of Lixnaw, to levy tribute and assert the Desmond overlordship. Having seized 200 head of cattle and wasted the country, he was confronted by Lixnaw himself on the way home and utterly defeated.

At the end of 1568, the absent Earl of Desmond granted Sir Warham St Leger a lease of the barony of Kerricurrihy, which cast fitz Maurice's inheritance into confusion. In 1569 the lord deputy of Ireland, Sir Henry Sidney, was informed by fitz Maurice that he had assembled the people of Desmond to tell them that the lord deputy was unable to procure the release of the captive earl, who would be executed or perpetually imprisoned, and that the people should proclaim a new earl or captain: with one voice, the people were said to have cried out for fitz Maurice to be captain. The earl's wife, Eleanor Butler, wrote to her husband in November that fitz Maurice was seeking to bring the earl into further disrepute and to usurp his inheritance, "by the example of his father".

To reassert Geraldine authority, fitz Maurice then launched what would become known as the first of the Desmond Rebellions. Southern Ireland erupted into a general rebellion, owing in part to attempts at establishing plantations. In June 1569, fitz Maurice and the Earl of Clancarty (MacCarthy Mor) invaded Kerrycurrihy, spoiled the inhabitants, took the castle-abbey of Tracton, hanged the garrison, and refused to depart without the surrender to them of the custody of Lady St Leger and Lady Grenville, the wives of the principal English colonists. Fitz Maurice then joined in league with the turbulent brothers of the earl of Ormond, and entered a bond with Conor O'Brien, 3rd Earl of Thomond, and John Burke, son of the Earl of Clanricard. He wrote to the mayor and corporation of Cork in July ordering the abolition of the new heresy of Protestantism, at a time when he appears to have been taking instruction from Irish Jesuits.

By September 1569, Sidney had broken the back of the rebellion and left Sir Humphrey Gilbert behind to suppress fitz Maurice, who sought refuge in the woods of Aherlow, south of Tipperary. After Gilbert's departure fitz Maurice raised a new force in February 1570 and by a surprise night attack on 2 March, took Kilmallock and after hanging the chief townsmen at the market cross, plundered its wealth and burned the town. In February 1571, Sir John Perrot landed at Waterford as President of Munster and challenged fitz Maurice to a duel, which fitz Maurice declined with the remark, "For if I should kill Sir John Perrot the Queen of England can send another president into this province; but if he do kill me there is none other to succeed me or to command as I do."

Fitz Maurice attacked Perrot, but retreated on mistaking a small cavalry company for the advance party of a larger force. After a second and successful siege by Perrot of the Geraldine stronghold of Castlemaine, fitz Maurice sued for pardon, which was granted in February 1573, after he prostrated himself in Kilmallock church with the president's sword point next to his heart. Fitz Maurice swore fealty to the crown, and gave up his son as hostage.

Continental intrigue 
After the return to Ireland of the Earl of Desmond in 1573, fitz Maurice left for the continent, offering his reasons variously as a desire to gain pardon from the queen through the French court, and the unkindness of the earl. In March 1575 he and his family, along with the Geraldine Seneschal of Imokilly, James Fitzedmund Fitzgerald, and the White Knight, Edmund Fitzgibbon, sailed on the La Arganys for St Malo, Brittany, where they were received by the governor. He had several interviews with Catherine de' Medici in Paris, offering to help make Henry III of France king of Ireland, and was granted a pension of 5,000 crowns in 1576.

Early in the following year he left for the Spanish court, where he offered the crown to the brother of King Philip II, Don John; the king was cautious, however. Fitz Maurice left his sons Maurice and Gerald with Cardinal Granvelle, and travelled to Italy to meet Pope Gregory XIII.

Invasion of Ireland 
At the papal court fitz Maurice met the adventurer Captain Thomas Stukley, and together they persuaded the pope to underwrite the cost of 1,000 troops to invade Ireland, most of whom, according to O'Sullivan Beare, were desperadoes the pope wished to get out of Italy. Stukley left Civitavecchia early in 1578 with his troops. Fitz Maurice and Stukley were to rendezvous in Lisbon and proceed to Ireland. However, Stukley decided to lend his troops and support to King Sebastian's expedition to Morocco, where he died at the Battle of Alcacer Quibir on 4 August 1578.

Following the diversion of Stukley to Morocco, fitz Maurice set out with the nuncio, Nicholas Sanders, and Matthew de Oviedo from Ferrol in Galicia, Spain on 17 June 1579 with a few troops on his vessel and three Spanish shallops. They captured two English vessels in the channel and landed at Dingle on 17 July 1579, launching the Second Desmond Rebellion.

On the 18th they cast anchor in Smerwick, where they garrisoned at Dún an Óir (Fort of Gold), and were joined on the 25th by two galleys with 100 troops. Four days later their ships were captured by the English fleet under the command of Sir William Winter. Having exhorted the Earl of Desmond and the Earl of Kildare, as Geraldine leaders, to fight the heretics, fitz Maurice left the fort to await the arrival of Stukley (who, unknown to him, had been killed at the Battle of Alcácer Quibir in the previous year, during a campaign by King Sebastian of Portugal).

Death 
Fitz Maurice was killed in a skirmish with forces of his cousin Theobald Burke on 18 August 1579 when he went to make a vow at the monastery of the Holy Cross, near Thurles in County Tipperary, but was caught in a skirmish with the forces of his cousin, Theobald Burke, during which he was shot in the hollow of the chest, but cut his way through to Burke and his brother William, both of whom he killed with single strokes of his sword.

The battle was won, but close to the scene his injuries overcame him; he made his will and ordered his friends to cut off his head after death so that his enemies might not mutilate his body. He begged his attendants to attest that he had not turned tail on the enemy. They assured him, and asked him to be quiet because enemy soldiers were closing in, but he insisted, "My wounds are clear, my wounds are clear". Upon his death, a kinsman ordered the decapitation and then wrapped the head in cloth; an attempt was made to conceal his body under a tree, but it was discovered by a hunter and brought to the town of Kilmallock. For weeks, the body was nailed to the gallows, until it was shattered by musket fire and collapsed.

Legacy 
The invasion force at Smerwick was besieged and massacred after surrender in 1580 by the English. The tide turned in favour of the English, and the Second Desmond Rebellion ended in 1583, when the Earl of Desmond and his followers had been hunted down and killed by the English and the Irish clans who had once willingly risen and fought beneath the banners of the Earl.

The destruction of the Desmond Earldom ended with the Desmond lands being both devastated and parcelled out to English undertakers in the Plantation of Munster, which was a major step in the Tudor conquest of Ireland.

Since the beheading of Silken Thomas in 1537, fitz Maurice was the first Irish clan chief to use the ongoing religious persecution of English and Irish Catholics as a grounds for war against the House of Tudor. Hugh O'Neill and Red Hugh O'Donnell may have been inspired by fitz Maurice for their uprising, which became known as the Nine Years War.

Fitz Maurice is now regarded as the man the Geraldines ought to have chosen to lead them if they were to resist the English Reformation.

Notes and references

Notes

Citations

Sources 

  – 1558 to 1578
  – 1579 to 1603
 
 
  – Dacre to Dysart
 
  – Irish Biography (for fitz Maurice)
  – (for timeline)
 
  – 1534–1691
 
 
 
 
 
 

1579 deaths
James
Irish soldiers
People of Elizabethan Ireland
People of the Second Desmond Rebellion
Year of birth unknown